A councillor is an elected representative for a local government council in some countries.

Canada 

Due to the control that the provinces have over their municipal governments, terms that councillors serve vary from province to province. Unlike most provincial elections, municipal elections are usually held on a fixed date of 4 years.

Finland
This is about honorary rank, not elected officials.

In Finland councillor (neuvos) is the highest possible title of honour which can be granted by the President of Finland. There are several ranks of councillors and they have existed since the Russian Rule. Some examples of different councillors in Finland are as follows:

Councillor of State: the highest class of the titles of honour; granted to successful statesmen
Mining Councillor/Trade Councillor/Industry Councillor/Economy Councillor: granted to leading industry figures in different fields of the economy
Councillor of Parliament: granted to successful statesmen
Office Councillor: granted to leading university figures
Councillor of Culture/Theatre Councillor/Film Councillor: granted to leading cultural figures
Chamber Councillor: granted for successful officials in the field of local government

India
As per the Seventy-fourth Amendment of the Constitution of India, municipal governance in India is looked after by elected councillors who are either member of municipal corporation (for cities) or municipality (for towns).

The Philippines
Under the Philippine Republic Act No. 7160 (otherwise known as the Local Government Code of 1991), a councilor is a member of a local council that is the legislative body of the local government unit. They are commonly referred to as "Sanggunian Member" because the official designation of municipal, city and provincial councils is the equivalent term in Filipino (used even when speaking or writing in English): Sanggunian Bayan, Sanggunian Panglunsod and Sanggunian Panlalawigan, respectively.

United Kingdom
All local authorities in the United Kingdom are overseen by elected councillors. These include:

unitary authorities
county councils and district councils
parish, town and community councils
The Common Council of the City of London (in which councillors are known as aldermen and councilmen)

According to Debrett's Correct Form the English title "Councillor" (often shortened to 'Cllr') applies only to elected members of city, borough or district councils. However, there is no legal basis for this restriction and in practice the title is applied to all councillors at all levels of local government. Where necessary, parish and county councillors are differentiated by the use of a fuller title such as "town councillor" or "county councillor". The title precedes the holder's rank or other title, as in Cllr Dr Jenny Smith or Cllr Sir Ricky Taing, and for women it precedes their title of marital status, as in Cllr Mrs Joan Smith.

Councillors are typically elected as members of political parties or alternatively as independents. Councils may also co-opt unelected councillors to fill vacancies on a council where insufficient candidates have stood for election, although in practice this is rare outside parish councils. Once elected, they are meant to represent all the residents under the whole authority, not just those who voted for them or just those in the district or ward they were elected in. They are bound by a code of conduct enforced by standards boards.

In 2007 the Electoral Administration Act 2006 reduced the age limit for councillors to 18, leading to younger people standing.

Youth councillors
Youth councillors are also elected in local areas by organisations that are a member of British Youth Council, such as Salford Youth Council.

Remuneration

Most councillors are not full-time professionals.

In England, Wales and Northern Ireland most larger borough, unitary authority or county councils do pay them basic allowances and out-of-pocket expenses. In addition, special responsibility allowances are paid to councillors who carry out more senior duties. The basic allowances and special responsibility allowances are theoretically paid to compensate councillors for time spent on council duties and are classed as salaries for tax purposes. Parish, town or community councillors may, since the Local Government Act 2000, be paid for their services.

In Scotland, since 2007, councillors have received a salary of £15,000, as opposed to a series of allowances. These are often topped up by special responsibility allowances.

Regional government

The London Assembly is regarded, not as a local authority, but as a regional devolved assembly and its members are referred to as Assembly Members, not councillors.

United States
Council member, councilman/councilwoman, councilor, or councillor is a title for a member of a council used in the United States.

In particular, the title is used in the following cases:
City councils or town councils that do not use the title of alderman
Council of the District of Columbia

Other countries

In Australia, The Bahamas, Canada, New Zealand, South Africa, Botswana, Trinidad and Tobago and other parts of the Commonwealth, as well as in the Republic of Ireland, a councillor or councilor is an elected representative on a local government council.

In the Netherlands, a member of the municipal council is called a gemeenteraadslid or raadslid. Someone out of this group who is elected to serve on the municipal executive is called a wethouder, which is usually translated as 'alderman' or 'councillor'. The Dutch word for mayor is burgemeester. This is expressed in English as "mayor" or "burgomaster". The municipal executive is referred to collectively as the College van Burgemeester en Wethouders.

In Belgium, a member of the municipal council is called a gemeenteraadslid in Dutch, and Conseiller Communal in French. Someone out of this group who is elected to serve on the municipal executive is called a schepen in Dutch or échevin in French. This is usually translated as "alderman" or "councillor" in English. The municipal executive is referred to collectively as the College van Burgemeester en Schepenen ou Collège du Bourgmestre et Echevins.

In Luxembourg, an échevin is a member of the administration of a Luxembourgian commune.

In Norway, a member of the municipal council, kommunestyret, is called a kommunestyrerepresentant in Norwegian. The Norwegian word for mayor is ordfører.

In Hong Kong, members of district councils are also referred to as councillors. Before 1999 the district councils were known as district boards, upon the abolition of the municipal councils (the UrbCo and the RegCo) in December that year. In addition, members of the legislative council are also referred to as councillors. From 1996 to 1998 the Legislative Council were known as "Provisional Legislative Council", upon the abolition of the interim legislature in July 1998.

Two types of councillor are elected in local elections held every five years in Turkey. These include 1,251 provincial councillors and 20,500 municipal councillors. Municipal councillors serve on the council of the 1,351 district and 30 metropolitan municipalities of Turkey, while provincial councillors serve on the provincial general council (İl Genel Meclisi).

References

Parliamentary titles
Political titles
Local government in the United Kingdom